Kopanka Druga  is a village in the administrative district of Gmina Gronowo Elbląskie, within Elbląg County, Warmian-Masurian Voivodeship, in northern Poland.

The village has a population of 150.

References

Kopanka Druga